Aboubacar Sankharé (born 17 January 1978 in Paris, France) is a French footballer who played as a defender, appearing in 14 matches in Ligue 1 for clubs RC Lens and Toulouse FC in the period of 1997–1999 and 19 matches in Ligue 2 for club US Créteil-Lusitanos in the period of 1999-2002. He also played for Fortuna Düsseldorf in the Regionalliga.

Personal life
Born in France, Sankharé is of Malian descent.

References

External links

1978 births
Living people
French footballers
French sportspeople of Malian descent
Footballers from Paris
RC Lens players
Toulouse FC players
US Créteil-Lusitanos players
Fortuna Düsseldorf players
Association football defenders
German footballers needing infoboxes